Erich Metze (7 May 1909 – 28 May 1952) was a German professional cyclist. 

He began his career as a road racer, and in 1931 won the Deutschland Tour and finished eights in the Tour de France. He then changed to motor-paced racing. In this discipline, he won four medals at the UCI Motor-paced World Championships between 1933 and 1938, including two gold medals in 1934 and 1938. He also won five national titles in 1933–1936 and 1939.

The long breaks in his career were caused by severe crashes, which caused two fractures of the skull. He had further injuries during World War II while fighting as a soldier. After the war he returned to competitions, but had another serious crash, which resulted in a third skull fracture and death in a hospital in 1952.

References

1909 births
1952 deaths
German male cyclists
Cyclists from Dortmund
UCI Track Cycling World Champions (men)
German track cyclists
German military personnel of World War II
20th-century German people